Yards is an unincorporated community straddling the border between Tazewell County, Virginia and Mercer County, West Virginia, United States. Yards had a post office on the Virginia side of the border from 1888 until May 28, 1994. The community was named for its railroad yards.

References

Unincorporated communities in Tazewell County, Virginia
Unincorporated communities in Mercer County, West Virginia
Unincorporated communities in Virginia
Unincorporated communities in West Virginia